Assahra Al Maghribiya is a daily arabophone Moroccan newspaper of Maroc Soir Group. The group was acquired by Saudi Arabian media executive Othman Al Omeir. The paper was launched in 1989. 

The sister publications of the paper are the royalist francophone Le Matin, the hispanophone La Mañana (defunct) and the online Anglophone newspaper Morocco Times (defunct).

References

External links

1989 establishments in Morocco
Arabic-language newspapers
Mass media in Casablanca
Newspapers established in 1989
Newspapers published in Morocco